Tadeusz Kotz (9 August 1913 – 3 June 2008) was a Polish pilot and fighter ace of World War II. He was awarded several decorations, including Poland's Virtuti Militari, four times Cross of Valour and the British Distinguished Flying Cross.  After the war he published his memoirs.

Biography

Tadeusz Kotz was born in Grabanów as Tadeusz Koc on 9 August 1913 to a family of wealthy farmers. After school he entered the cadet flying school in Dęblin. Later, he served in the Polish Air Force as a fighter pilot. During the Invasion of Poland in 1939, Kotz fought with the Polish 161st Fighter Escadrille air unit of Łódź Army.  He shot down his first enemy Messerschmitt on 2 September 1939, and also shared in the destruction of a Junkers Ju-86 while piloting a PZL P.11 airplane. On 16 September he shot down a Soviet reconnaissance bomber Polikarpov R-5.

After Poland was defeated, Kotz was ordered to evacuate to Romania along with other pilots. He escaped via Yugoslavia and Greece to France, and then to the UK to serve with the Royal Air Force. Commencing in late 1940, Kotz served with No 317, No 308 and No. 303 Squadron, flying the Spitfire.

Later, he became a Squadron Leader with No. 303 Squadron. In February 1943 Kotz was shot down in combat with II./JG 26 over Northern France, but evaded capture and returned to England via German-occupied France in record timing, Spain and Gibraltar to return to the UK on 21 February 1943. This escape report, along with a copy of his combat report dated 3 February 1943 was held classified and put on a secret list until 1973.  In September 1944, he attended the Aviation School in Weston-super-Mare. His wartime score was 3 and 3 shared destroyed, 2 probables, and 3 damaged.

He was demobilized in 1948. He married and settled in Swaziland in Africa and then moved to Collingwood, Ontario, Canada, where he spent the remainder of his life. While in Canada, he published a book of memoirs. Błękitne niebo i prawdziwe kule ("Blue sky and real bullets"), in 2005. He died on 3 June 2008 at a nursing home in Collingwood, aged 94.

Awards 
 Virtuti Militari Silver Cross
 Cross of Valour four times
 Distinguished Flying Cross

References

Bibliography
 Kotz, Tadeusz. "Błękitne niebo i prawdziwe kule", Toronto, 2005, Ontario Limited.
 Izydor Koliński: Wojsko Polskie : krótki informator historyczny o Wojsku Polskim w latach II wojny światowej. 9, Regularne jednostki Wojska Polskiego (lotnictwo), formowanie, działania bojowe, organizacja, uzbrojenie, metryki jednostek lotniczych. Warszawa : Wydawnictwo Ministerstwa Obrony Narodowej 1978.
 Tadeusz Jerzy Krzystek, Anna Krzystek: Polskie Siły Powietrzne w Wielkiej Brytanii w latach 1940-1947 łącznie z Pomocniczą Lotniczą Służbą Kobiet (PLSK-WAAF). Sandomierz: Stratus, 2012, s. 280. 
 Piotr Sikora: Asy polskiego lotnictwa. Warszawa: Oficyna Wydawnicza Alma-Press. 2014, s. 394. 
 Jerzy Pawlak: Absolwenci Szkoły Orląt: 1925-1939. Warszawa: Retro-Art, 2009, s. 167.

External links
 Tadeusz Kotz in Polish school - London
 Tadeusz Kotz on Polish Air Force site

1913 births
2008 deaths
People from Biała Podlaska County
Polish World War II flying aces
Recipients of the Distinguished Flying Cross (United Kingdom)
Recipients of the Silver Cross of the Virtuti Militari
Recipients of the Cross of Valour (Poland)
Royal Air Force officers